The Scotland Malawi Partnership (SMP) is a non-profit umbrella organisation which co-ordinates the activities of Scottish individuals and organisations with existing links to Malawi, and aims to foster further links between both countries.  It is a charitable membership organisation, with over 1,100 members.  It is independent of the Scottish Government and Scottish Parliament, although it works closely with both.

Vision and mission 
The partnership's vision is "to inspire people and organisations of Scotland to be involved with Malawi in an informed, co-ordinated and effective way so that both nations benefit".

Its mission is to foster links, consistent with its values, between the two nations, and encourage development of sustainable projects in Malawi by:
 Raising awareness and encouraging support
 Acting as a forum for encouraging best possible practice
 Enabling organisations in Scotland to take advantage of opportunities in Malawi
 Encouraging reduced poverty in Malawi and an improved standard of living for all
 Developing support mechanisms for exchanges and advanced understanding between Scotland and Malawi
 Working with partners to develop an infrastructure in Scotland and Malawi to support these activities
 Informing others in Scotland, including members, about these activities and developments in Malawi

History

Scottish links with Malawi

Links between Scotland and Malawi began with David Livingstone's journeys up the Zambezi and Shire Rivers to Lake Malawi in 1859, long before the borders of the modern nation of Malawi had been established. Both the Church of Scotland and the Free Church of Scotland had established missions in Malawi by the mid-1870s. These missionaries persuaded the UK government to declare the area a British Protectorate. This colonial arrangement lasted, in various forms, until full independence was achieved on 6 July 1964, with Malawi becoming a member of the Commonwealth.

Origins

The Scotland Malawi Partnership was born from the 'Malawi Millennium Project' of the University of Strathclyde and Bell College, in response to the belief that there was a need to bring together under a single umbrella the many organizations and individuals throughout Scotland engaged in fostering and developing links between Scotland and Malawi.

The partnership was officially launched in the Glasgow City Chambers on 22 April 2004 by the Lord Provosts of Glasgow and Edinburgh, with the support of Ibrahim Milazi, the High Commissioner of Malawi, and representatives from the Universities of Glasgow and Strathclyde, the Church of Scotland, and the Scottish Catholic International Aid Fund (SCIAF). 
The Lord Provost of Glasgow and Dr Peter West (Secretary of the University of Strathclyde) thereafter travelled to Malawi, and, with the support of Norman Ling, the (then) British High Commissioner, and numerous prominent Malawians, established the Malawi Committee of the Scotland Malawi Partnership which held its first meeting on 28 September 2004.

Developments since formation

On 29 April 2005 the Scotland Malawi Partnership held a 'Shaping the Partnership' consultative conference at the University of Strathclyde, attended by approximately 100 people – representatives of NGOs, universities, small charities, hospitals and individuals with an interest in Malawi. Guests heard speeches from Ms Patricia Ferguson MSP, Minister for Tourism, Culture and Sport; The Lord Provost of Glasgow; Professor David Rubadiri, Vice Chancellor of the University of Malawi; Dr Peter West and the Rev Howard Matiya Nkhoma, General Secretary of the Livingstonia Synod of the Church of Central Africa Presbyterian (CCAP). The proposed structure and remit of the partnership were decided upon.

Shortly after this meeting, an Interim Board was formed, with the Rev Prof Ken Ross as the chair and Dr Peter West as the Vice Chair. Three founding members of the Scotland Malawi Partnership were subsequently identified – the Malawi Millennium Project, Malawi Tomorrow and Child Survival in Malawi.

Working in collaboration with the Scottish Executive, the partnership staged a 'Malawi Health Workshop' in October 2005, attended by over 65 Scottish health professionals. Delegates endorsed the Partnership's plan to maintain related databases for networking purposes.

November 2005 was a significant month for the Scotland Malawi Partnership. The partnership's conference, 'Malawi After Gleneagles: A Commission for Africa Case-Study', was held at the Scottish Parliament, involving over 250 delegates from Malawi and Scotland engaged in debates about international development. The First Minister, Jack McConnell MSP, and the late President of Malawi, Dr Bingu wa Mutharika, were keynote speakers – and during the President's visit the Cooperation Agreement between Scotland and Malawi was signed.

Other developments include Funding and support to

Other important developments in November 2005 were formal acceptance of the first applications for membership of the Scotland Malawi Partnership and confirmation of secure funding from the then Scottish Executive (now Scottish Government) for two and a half years. The partnership became a fully recognized legal entity on 12 December 2005, having registered as a Scottish Charity (SC037048) and as a Company Limited by Guarantee (SC294378). In the process, the partnership's Memorandum and Articles of Association was also formally ratified.

From May 2006 a full-time coordinator, Leo Williams, was appointed, working from the University of Strathclyde. Assisted by seed funding from the Interim Board, the Malawi Committee held its official launch at the Capital Hotel in Lilongwe, attended by Patricia Ferguson (then Minister for Tourism, Culture and Sport) and a delegation from the Scottish Executive, as well as numerous prominent Malawians. The Scotland Malawi Partnership was registered as a Company Limited by Guarantee in Malawi (7852) on 4 May 2006.

June 2006 saw the Lord Provosts of Edinburgh and Glasgow become Honorary Presidents of the Scotland Malawi Partnership. In collaboration with the Committee of Malawians in Scotland, the partnership staged a 'Malawi Independence Celebration' on 1 July to introduce the partnership to as many Malawians as possible. Guests of honour included His Excellency Dr Francis Moto (Malawi High Commissioner to the UK), His Honour Mr Colin Cameron (Malawi Honorary Consul to Scotland), Ms Patricia Ferguson MSP and the Moyenda Band.

In August 2006 the Scotland Malawi Partnership relocated from an office in the University of Strathclyde to Edinburgh City Chambers.

With the transition to a Scottish National Party (SNP) Government in May 2007, the SNP launched a pledge which successfully persuaded the new administration to continue supporting Malawi – soon after they announced that at least £3 million per year from the International Development Fund would be reserved ("ring fenced") for Malawi projects.

Activities and impacts
Since its inception in 2004, the Scotland Malawi Partnership has staged organisational conferences in Edinburgh and Glasgow, bringing together representatives of Malawian and Scottish civil societies, governments, churches, educational institutions and NGOs, as well as workshops dealing specifically with issues relating to health and education. Malawi Independence Celebrations are held in Scotland annually around 6 July to commemorate Malawian independence from the United Kingdom in 1964.

The partnership circulates regular weekly news bulletins and monthly newsletters to members, detailing developments in the relationship between Scotland and Malawi, key news from Malawi, reports from members, partnership news, and upcoming events.

In 2007, the SMP hosted 3 stakeholder meetings focused on funding, health links and agriculture. These meetings were attended by 57 participants from 42 different organisations. Three workshops in relation to educational links and "best practice" were also held, attended by 150 individuals representing 43 different members of the partnership and 50 non members (schools, colleges and universities attending the Partnerships in Education Workshop). The partnership has also been involved in the establishment and oversight of working groups in microfinance (which led to the formation of the Scotland Malawi Business Group), governance, housing cooperatives and school partnerships. The School Partnerships Working Group has produced a Practical Guide to School Partnerships Between Scotland and Malawi.

Since the signing of the Scotland Malawi Cooperation Agreement, some 58 projects (many involving partnership members) have benefited from Scottish government funding, including the Mary's Meals project, which feeds Malawian schoolchildren, and the Malawi Millennium Project to deliver equipment to schools for visually impaired children.

Academic Exchange

The partnership also administers a project of Academic Exchange, which provides for the exchange of academic staff, administrators and librarians between the Universities of Scotland and Malawi. Over the period between 2007 and 2010, the project provided for the exchange of 24 'Fellows' – 12 Scottish, 12 Malawian. The first Scottish Fellow was David Bone. Mr Bone was attached to the Theology and Religious Studies Department at Chancellor College. On the Malawi side, Solomon Dindi was the first fellow to visit Scotland. Mr Dindi was attached to the University of Strathclyde's IT Services Department.

The Academic Exchange project aimed to:
 Allow young Malawian academics to visit Scotland for periods of between three and nine months, in order to gain exposure to and experience of the Scottish Higher Education system.
 Allow such Malawian academics space to complete and write up research projects.
 Afford Malawian university administrators or librarians the opportunity to gain exposure to systems in Scotland, and to update their professional skills as a result of placements at Scottish universities.
 Enable Scottish academics, administrators and librarians to build capacity within universities in Malawi.
 Give Scottish academics, administrators and librarians the opportunity to work in a very different environment, and thus to acquire skills and knowledge which they could not acquire in Scotland.

EDUCATION VISIT'''
There are so many schools in Scotland that supports Malawi schools. Most schools are catholic. One among such schools is St Peters catholic in Mzuzu, Malawi which saw the first group of students from the school visit St Michael's Academy, Kilwinning Scotland on an education visit in March 2006. The group had students like Winnie Mwamsamali, Mercy Wowa, Maxwell Lungu, Dennis Joles, Mr Alex Ziba and Mrs Sylvia Nhlane. The group had a chance to visit the Scottish Parliament and talk with the then first Minister of Scotland, Jack McConnell who explained to them the Scotland-Malawi agreement. The school remains in partnership with Scotland through St Matthews Academy, after St Michael's Academy merged with St Andrews Academy. The students were each assigned to a Scottish family so that they would experience Scottish life besides getting into classes and experiencing Scottish education.

School Partnerships Working Group
In November 2006 the Scotland Malawi Partnership formed a School Partnership Working Group to coordinate requests from Scottish schools to create partnerships with Malawian schools. This working group brings together numerous organisations involved in school partnerships, including the Scottish Government, Scottish International Relief, UNICEF, Link Community Development, the League for the Exchange of Commonwealth Teachers, the British Council, ScotDec, the Church of Scotland, the International Development Education Association of Scotland (IDEAS), and representatives of schools with existing partnerships.

In recent years, school links between Malawi and Scotland have increased from around 10 schools to around 100. A large number of the Scottish schools involved in these partnerships are members of the SMP.

Organisational structure and members
The Scotland Malawi Partnership has continued to grow year on year since its inception in 2004. As a result, the organisation has developed a well-organised structure to effectively service its growing membership.

The Board
The partnership has a board of directors serviced by chair, Ken Ross; 3 co-vice chairs; and approximately a dozen members.

Committees
The partnership also created 3 committees to manage different aspects of organisational functioning – Audit and Finance Committee; Policy and Strategy Committee; and Staffing Committee.

Forums
In order to give members the opportunity to exchange information on a subject specific basis, the partnership developed 5 forums:
Higher and Further Education Forum
Primary and Secondary School Forum
Business, Investment, Trade and Tourism Forum
Governance Forum
Health Links Forum

The different forums host meetings throughout the year in order to discuss relevant issues in Malawi and exchange advice and expertise on each topic. Members are welcome to join any forum. The partnership also actively encourages anyone with links or interests in Malawi to attend the forums to share or develop their knowledge and views.

The partnership has also launched a new youth membership category with an event at the Scottish Parliament in November 2012. The event was attended by over 200 guests including Minister for External Affairs and International Development, Humza Yousaf MSP, and Maureen Watt MSP. It was primarily a networking event; aimed at enabling schools, young people aged 16–24, charities, and organisations with links or interests in Malawi to share their ideas, knowledge and experience. The youth membership category successfully signed up nearly 100 new members at the event.

Princess Anne is the Honorary Patron of the SMP as was the late Malawian President Dr Bingu wa Mutharika.

References

External links
 Website of the Scotland Malawi Partnership

2004 establishments in Scotland
Organizations established in 2004
Charities based in Edinburgh
Organisations based in Edinburgh with royal patronage
Development charities based in the United Kingdom
Malawi–United Kingdom relations
Foreign relations of Scotland
Children's charities based in Scotland
Foreign charities operating in Malawi